The Mitsunobu reaction is an organic reaction that converts an alcohol into a variety of functional groups, such as an ester, using triphenylphosphine and an azodicarboxylate such as diethyl azodicarboxylate (DEAD) or diisopropyl azodicarboxylate (DIAD). Although DEAD and DIAD are most commonly used, there are a variety of other azodicarboxylates available which facilitate an easier workup and/or purification and in some cases, facilitate the use of more basic nucleophiles. It was discovered by Oyo Mitsunobu (1934–2003). In a typical protocol, one dissolves the alcohol, the carboxylic acid, and triphenylphosphine in tetrahydrofuran or other suitable solvent (e.g. diethyl ether), cool to 0 °C using an ice-bath, slowly add the DEAD dissolved in THF, then stir at room temperature for several hours. The alcohol reacts with the phosphine to create a good leaving group then undergoes an inversion of stereochemistry in classic SN2 fashion as the nucleophile displaces it. A common side-product is produced when the azodicarboxylate displaces the leaving group instead of the desired nucleophile. This happens if the nucleophile is not acidic enough (pKa larger than 13) or is not nucleophilic enough due to steric or electronic constraints. A variation of this reaction utilizing a nitrogen nucleophile is known as a Fukuyama–Mitsunobu.

Several reviews have been published.

Reaction mechanism
The reaction mechanism of the Mitsunobu reaction is fairly complex. The identity of intermediates and the roles they play has been the subject of debate.

Initially, the triphenyl phosphine (2) makes a nucleophilic attack upon diethyl azodicarboxylate (1) producing a betaine intermediate 3, which deprotonates the carboxylic acid (4) to form the ion pair 5. The formation of the ion pair 5 is very fast. 

The second phase of the mechanism is proposed to be phosphorus-centered, the DEAD having been converted to the hydrazine. The ratio and interconversion of intermediates 8–11 depend on the carboxylic acid pKa and the solvent polarity. Although several phosphorus intermediates are present, the attack of the carboxylate anion upon intermediate 8 is the only productive pathway forming the desired product 12 and triphenylphosphine oxide (13).

The formation of the oxyphosphonium intermediate 8 is slow and facilitated by the alkoxide. Therefore, the overall rate of reaction is controlled by carboxylate basicity and solvation.

Order of addition of reagents
The order of addition of the reagents of the Mitsunobu reaction can be important. Typically, one dissolves the alcohol, the carboxylic acid, and triphenylphosphine in tetrahydrofuran or other suitable solvent (e.g. diethyl ether), cool to 0 °C using an ice-bath, slowly add the DEAD dissolved in THF, then stir at room temperature for several hours. If this is unsuccessful, then preforming the betaine may give better results. To preform the betaine, add DEAD to triphenylphosphine in tetrahydrofuran at 0 °C, followed by the addition of the alcohol and finally the acid.

Variations

Other nucleophilic functional groups
Many other functional groups can serve as nucleophiles besides carboxylic acids. For the reaction to be successful, the nucleophile must have a pKa less than 15.

Modifications
Several modifications to the original reagent combination have been developed in order to simplify the separation of the product and avoid production of so much chemical waste. One variation of the Mitsunobu reaction uses resin-bound triphenylphosphine and uses di-tert-butylazodicarboxylate instead of DEAD. The oxidized triphenylphosphine resin can be removed by filtration, and the di-tert-butylazodicarboxylate byproduct is removed by treatment with trifluoroacetic acid. Bruce H. Lipshutz has developed an alternative to DEAD, di-(4-chlorobenzyl)azodicarboxylate (DCAD) where the hydrazine by-product can be easily removed by filtration and recycled back to DCAD.

A modification has also been reported in which DEAD can be used in catalytic versus stoichiometric quantities, however this procedure requires the use of stoichiometric (diacetoxyiodo)benzene to oxidise the hydrazine by-product back to DEAD.

Denton and co-workers have reported a redox-neutral variant of the Mitsunobu reaction which employs a phosphorus(III) catalyst to activate the substrate, ensuring inversion in the nucleophilic attack, and uses a Dean-Stark trap to remove the water by-product.

Phosphorane reagents

Tsunoda et al. have shown that one can combine the triphenylphosphine and the diethyl azodicarboxylate into one reagent: a phosphorane ylide. Both (cyanomethylene)trimethylphosphorane (CMMP, R = Me) and (cyanomethylene)tributylphosphorane (CMBP, R = Bu) have proven particularly effective.

The ylide acts as both the reducing agent and the base. The byproducts are acetonitrile (6) and the trialkylphosphine oxide (8).

Uses
The Mitsunobu reaction has been applied in the synthesis of aryl ethers:

With these particular reactants the conversion with DEAD fails because the hydroxyl group is only weakly acidic. Instead the related 1,1'-(azodicarbonyl)dipiperidine (ADDP) is used of which the betaine intermediate is a stronger base. The phosphine is a polymer-supported triphenylphosphine (PS-PPh3).

The reaction has been used to synthesize quinine, colchicine, sarain, morphine, stigmatellin, eudistomin, oseltamivir, strychnine, and nupharamine.

References

See also
 Appel reaction

Substitution reactions
Name reactions